Jaime Javier Ayoví Corozo (born 21 February 1988 in Eloy Alfaro, Esmeraldas is an Ecuadorian footballer who plays for Gençlerbirliği in the TFF First League.

Club career

Emelec
Ayoví started at lower division club Paladín "S". In 2006, his cousin Walter Ayoví recommended him to try out at Emelec. He did and was impressive enough to be signed on a 4-year deal when he was 18 years.

Despite his height and size he started playing as an open forward, or a winger and not as a center forward, because he is very skilled with the ball and very fast and he did not like to have to go down the middle but preferred to run to the sides where there was more space to move.

On 2009 he was loaned to first division club Manta to gain more minutes and experience. He did well playing in 32 matches of the Ecuadorian league and scoring 7 goals, despite this Emelec management were going to loan him again for the next season, but newly signed manager Jorge Sampaoli saw videos of Ayoví and requested him to stay in the 2010 squad, as a first substitution for the Argentinian striker Hernan Peirone.

As the 2010 season started it was becoming clear that Ayoví would have plenty more chances than expected and soon he became Sampaoli's first choice for the attack leaving Peirone in the bench. Ayoví did not disappoint and quickly started scoring important goals for his team, and was absolutely key to Emelec winning the first stage of the 2010 Ecuadorian tournament and reaching the final to be played in December 2010.

Toluca

2011
After the 2010 Ecuadorian season ended Jaime agree to join Mexican team Toluca on a three-year deal. He scored his first goal in his second appearance against Chiapas. On February 13 he scored his second in an emphatic 5–0 away win against Querétaro. He scored in a 3–2 home loss against Necaxa. On 13 February Ayovi scored an impressive header against Santos Laguna, in just under a minute of game time. Toluca won 3–1 at home turf. His final goal with Toluca came on 3 April and impressive solo effort, to draw the game against Monterrey 1–1.

Pachuca

2011–12 season
After only half a season, Ayovi impressed the Pachuca manager, which sought to sign him for the team, Pachuca. His first goal for Pachuca was on 31 June, in a 2–2 away draw against Puebla FC. He would only score 3 more goals for the rest of the Apertura season against Cruz Azul, Estudiantes Tecos and Atlante FC. The 2012 Clausura would prove to be the same, scoring only 4 goals against Puebla, Cruz Azul, Querétaro and Chivas de Guadalajara. Due to his form with Pachuca, he was loaned to Saudi Arabian Premier League club Al Nassr.

Loan to Al Nassr FC

2012–13 season
Jaime Ayovi was loaned to Al Nassr FC for undisclosed fee which may lead up to the end of the Saudi Premier League season. On 29 September, Ayovi scored his first goal with Al Nassr, winning 3–1 against Al Wahda. He would go on to score 7 more goals for Al Nassr, including 2 doubles against Al Faisaly and Al Taawon, winning 2–1 and 3–2. His Saudi Premier League season was cut short when he was injured and was side-lined for 8 months. He finished his season with Al Nassr with 8 goals in 15 matches.

Club Tijuana
Northern Mexican football club Xolos de Tijuana signed Jaime Ayoví, with the agreement that he would be loaned to Ecuadorian giants LDU Quito for one full season, to fully recover his lost form due to injury.

Loan to LDU Quito

2013
Jaime Ayovi was given the number 11 jersey for his year-long stay at LDU Quito. On 17 August Ayovi scored his first goals, in a 2–2 home draw against Independiente del Valle. On 22 September Jaime scored his third in a 1–1 home draw against Macara. On October 3 he scored again in a 1–1 home draw versus Deportivo Quito. On 27 October Jaime scored his fifth goal with LDU Quito, in a 2–1 home win over LDU Loja. On November 10 Ayovi scored another double, this time in a 3–1 home win over Deportivo Quevedo.

Return to Tijuana
On 7 March 2014, Ayoví scored his first goal for Tijuana against Guadalajara in a 2-0 Home Win. On 17 July 2014 it was confirmed that Ayoví would no longer fit the plans of the club.

Loan to Godoy Cruz
On 14 August 2014, it was confirmed that Ayoví would play for Godoy Cruz on loan for 6 months.

Beijing Renhe
On 20 February 2017, it was confirmed that Ayoví would play for Chinese League One side Beijing Renhe.

Gençlerbirliği
On 5 January 2023, Ayoví joined TFF First League club Gençlerbirliği on a one-and-a-half-year deal.

International career
Ayoví was called by Ecuador's new manager, the Colombian Reinaldo Rueda, to defend the Ecuador national team for the first time in a match against Mexico in Guadalajara on 4 September 2010, when he played well and even managed to score Ecuador's second goal for an overall 2–1 victory.

Career statistics

Club

International

International goals

Honours

Club
Emelec
 Serie A Runner-up (2): 2006, 2010

Individual
Emelec
 2010 Ecuadorian Serie A: Best Player
 2010 Ecuadorian Serie A: Top goalscorer

References

External links
 
 
 
 https://web.archive.org/web/20140415201636/http://www.ecuafutbol.org/servicios/FichaJugadores.aspx?valor1=0924618051
 https://web.archive.org/web/20100823110812/http://www.ecuagol.com/ecuagol/camp/profile.php?campID=15&jugadorID=919
 https://www.youtube.com/results?search_query=jaime+ayovi&aq=2

1988 births
Living people
People from Eloy Alfaro Canton
Ecuadorian footballers
Ecuadorian expatriate footballers
Ecuador international footballers
C.S. Emelec footballers
Manta F.C. footballers
Deportivo Toluca F.C. players
C.F. Pachuca players
Al Nassr FC players
Club Tijuana footballers
L.D.U. Quito footballers
Godoy Cruz Antonio Tomba footballers
Beijing Renhe F.C. players
Shabab Al-Ahli Club players
Guayaquil City F.C. footballers
L.D.U. Portoviejo footballers
C.D. Olmedo footballers
Estudiantes de La Plata footballers
C.S.D. Independiente del Valle footballers
Gençlerbirliği S.K. footballers
Ecuadorian Serie A players
Liga MX players
Argentine Primera División players
China League One players
Chinese Super League players
Saudi Professional League players
UAE Pro League players
2014 FIFA World Cup players
Copa América Centenario players
Association football forwards
Ecuadorian expatriate sportspeople in Mexico
Ecuadorian expatriate sportspeople in Saudi Arabia
Ecuadorian expatriate sportspeople in Argentina
Ecuadorian expatriate sportspeople in China
Ecuadorian expatriate sportspeople in the United Arab Emirates
Expatriate footballers in Mexico
Expatriate footballers in Saudi Arabia
Expatriate footballers in Argentina
Expatriate footballers in China
Expatriate footballers in the United Arab Emirates